The Asturias Offensive was an offensive in Asturias during the Spanish Civil War which lasted  from 1 September to 21 October 1937. 45,000 men of the Spanish Republican Army met 90,000 men of the Nationalist forces.

Background
After the failed Republican offensive against Zaragoza, the Nationalists decided to redeploy their forces and continued their offensive against the last piece of Republican-held territory in the North, Asturias. On 29 August, the Sovereign Council of Asturias, led by Belarmino Tomas, assumed all military and civil powers and appointed Colonel Prada as commander of the Republican Army of the North.

Opposing forces
The Nationalist offensive was launched by General Dávila's Army of the North, with 80,000 men. This force included José Solchaga's four Navarrese brigades, Aranda's three divisions and the Italian CTV. The Nationalists also had 250 cannons and 250 aircraft.

Opposing them, the Republicans had the Army of the North, led by Colonel Prada, with the XIV Army Corps led by Francisco Galán (8,000–10,000 men) and Colonel Linares's XVII Army corps (35,000). Prada's chief of staff was Francisco Ciutat. The Republicans had 180 cannons, one squadron of Chatos and two flights of Moscas, around 35 aircraft.

The Nationalist Offensive

The Nationalist offensive started on 1 September, with Solchaga advancing from the East and Aranda from the southwest, but despite their crushing numerical and air superiority their advance was painfully slow (less than a kilometre a day). The Republicans fought fiercely, and the difficult terrain of the Cordillera Cantabrica provided excellent defensive positions. Solchaga's troops (33,000 men) occupied Llanes on September 5 and in the Battle of El Mazuco attacked the heights, held by the CNT workers from La Felguera (5,000 men). The Navarrese eventually took the valley and surrounding mountains, but only after 33 days of bloody combat.  On September 18, the Nationalists occupied Ribadesella, and on 1 October Covadonga, but by 14 October the Republicans still held several high passes of the Leonese Mountains.

The main goal of the Republicans was to delay the Nationalist advance until winter came.  Nevertheless, the Legion Condor returned from the Aragon front and started to bomb the Republican positions. The German squadrons used cans of petrol attached to incendiary bombs and tested the idea of carpet bombing. On 14 October Arriondas fell, and Colonel Muñoz Grandes managed to break the Republican front, entering Tama and advancing to Campo de Caso. The Republican troops retreated to Gijón, and on 15 October Solchaga's troops joined up with Aranda's troops.

The Republican government then ordered a general evacuation. On 17 October the Sovereign Council of Asturias decided to start the evacuation, but the Legion Condor sank the Republican destroyer Ciscar, and the Nationalist fleet blocked the Asturian harbours. Only the senior officers managed to escape on gunboats and fishing vessels (Prada, Galán, Segundo Blanco, Belarmino Tomas). On 20 October, twenty-two Republican battalions surrendered, and Colonel José Franco handed over the town of Trubia to the Nationalists. On October 21, the Nationalists entered Gijón, ending the occupation of Asturias. Nevertheless, thousands of Republican soldiers fled to the nearby mountains and started a guerrilla campaign against the Nationalist troops.

Aftermath
The Nationalist reprisals were harsh. In Oviedo alone, 1,000 republican prisoners were shot. The Republican prisoners were sent to labour battalions or were forced to join the Nationalist army (around 100,000). Furthermore, with the conquest of the North, the Nationalists now controlled 36 per cent of Spanish industrial production, 60 per cent of the coal, and all of the steel-production.

See also 

 List of Spanish Nationalist military equipment of the Spanish Civil War
 List of weapons of the Corpo Truppe Volontarie
 Condor Legion
 List of Spanish Republican military equipment of the Spanish Civil War

Notes

Bibliography
 
 

Battles of the Spanish Civil War
Battles in Asturias
1937 in Spain
Conflicts in 1937
September 1937 events
October 1937 events